The Atlas beetle (Chalcosoma atlas) is a very large species of beetle in the family Scarabaeidae, found in Southeast Asia. Males have three prominent horns. The species is named for Atlas, the giant of Greek mythology who supported the skies.

Description
Chalcosoma atlas, like other beetles of the genus Chalcosoma, is remarkable for its size. Males have specialised horns on their head and thorax that they use to fight with each other, to gain mating rights with females. The Atlas beetle differs from other Chalcosoma species (such as C. caucasus) by the broader end of the cephalic (head) horn.

Larvae
The larva of the Atlas beetle is known for its fierce behavior, including biting if touched. Unverified reports exist of larvae that live together fighting to the death if they have insufficient space or food.

Distribution
Chalcosoma atlas is found in Southeast Asia.

Parasitoids

The species is the host of a parasitoid, the giant scoliid wasp Megascolia procer, which has a paralysing venom.

Subspecies
Chalcosoma atlas atlas (Linnaeus, 1758)- Sulawesi
Chalcosoma atlas butonensis Nagai, 2004- Buton island
Chalcosoma atlas keyboh Nagai, 2004- Malaysia and Sumatra
Chalcosoma atlas mantetsu Nagai, 2004- Thailand and Vietnam
Chalcosoma atlas simeuluensis Nagai, 2004- Simeule island
Chalcosoma atlas sintae Nagai, 2004- Peleng islands
Chalcosoma atlas hesperus (Erichson, 1834)- Philippines

Gallery

References

External links

Biolib
Kazuo Kawano Character Displacement in Giant Rhinoceros Beetles

Dynastinae
Beetles described in 1758
Beetles of Asia
Taxa named by Carl Linnaeus